On 5 June 1465, in a location around Ávila, a group of  Castilian noblemen deposed of King Henry IV of Castile in effigy, and instead proclaimed his half-brother  Prince Alfonso, better known as "Alfonso the Innocent", as king. This ceremony became known by its detractors as the farce of Ávila.

Background 
During the reign of Henry IV, the various factions of the nobility fought among themselves and against the king to buy up plots of power. The powerful El poderoso Marquis of Villena was unhappy with the preferential treatment by the king of his rivals, the house of Mendoza and the favourite Beltrán de la Cueva. The Marquis formed an alliance against the king along with the archbishops of Toledo, Seville, and Santiago, the house of Enríquez, the counts of Plasencia and of Alba and other minor noblemen and clergymen.

On 11 December 1464, the anti-Henry league gave an ultimatum: if the king did not rectify his behavior and get rid of his government, he would be deposed. Henry tried to negotiate, but no agreement was reached, and the king was deposed, first in Plasencia on 27 April 1465, and later in Ávila on 5 June.

Development of the ceremony  

On a large platform visible from a distance, the conspirators erected a wooden statue representing the king, dressed in mourning clothes and with his crown, staff, and sword. Those present at the ceremony were Alfonso Carrillo archbishop of Toledo, the marquis of Villena, the count of Plasencia, the count of Benavente and other minor noblemen, as well as the general population of commoners. Also present was the prince Alfonso who had not yet reached eleven years of age.

Mass was performed, and once finished, the rebels headed to the stage to read a declaration of all the charges against Henry IV. According to them, the king showed sympathy towards Muslims; was homosexual, his character was conciliatory and overcautious; and, the most serious charge, he was not the real father of  princess Joanna, which meant that she was ineligible to inherit the throne.

After the speech, the archbishop of Toledo removed the crown from the effigy, which was the symbol of royal dignity. Then the count of Plasencia took the sword, symbol of administration of justice, and the count of Benavente took the staff, symbol of government. Finally, Diego López de Zúñiga, brother of the count of  Plasencia, tore down the statue, saying  “To the ground, bitch!”.

Then they brought the prince Alfonso to the platform, and proclaimed him king, yelling “Castile, by King  Alfonso!” and proceeded with the hand-kissing ceremony.

Consequences 
The new king Alfonso XII was considered a puppet in the hands of marquis of Villena and was not accepted by the majority of the country, which remained loyal to Henry IV. The situation deteriorated into riots which lasted until the death of Alfonso in 1468 and the submission of his sister Isabel to the authority of Henry IV, but he did in fact rule as Alfonso XII in the three remaining years of his life after the coup, as described by the investigator Óscar Perea, and maintained a court with an active cultural life which included several important noblement like Diego Gómez Manrique  and his nephew Jorge, the jurist Nicolás de Guevara and the chansonnier poet Juan Álvarez Gato or historian Diego de Valera, chief steward of the king in 1467, as well as the  Marquis of Villena; also Rodrigo Alfonso Pimentel, count of Benavente, and Pedro de Villandrando, count of Ribadeo, and Diego de Ribera, tutor of prince Alfonso and the person in charge of the stables, or Sancho de Rojas, lord of Cavia and Monzón and chief nobleman of Castile; Martín de Távara; the prior of Osma, jurist and royal chaplain to Alfonso XII Francisco Gómez de Miranda and others. His court also included prominent singers Diego Rangel o Cristóbal de Morales. Don Diego Gómez Manrique organized festivities and composed theatrical "momos" teatrales to celebrate the royal birthday in which the court ladies played the role of fairies. Of the brilliant poets in this court was Jorge Manrique and his Verses on the death of his father:''

Later, the Marquis de Villena, his relatives and some of its allies broke with Isabel and dying Enrique in 1474, supported the Princess Juana as heiress to the throne, although not a few of the members of the Court of Alfonso XII spent the Elizabethan side and thrived on it. He thus broke the War of the Castilian Succession, which lasted until 1479.

References 
Bibliography:

Footnotes

1465 in Europe